Mindstate may refer to:

 Mindstate (Pete Philly and Perquisite album), 2005
 Mindstate (Shades of Culture album), 1998